Manceaux may refer to:

 The male denizens of Le Mans, France
 The male denizens of the traditional province of Maine, France
 Brigitte Manceaux (1914–1963), French pianist
 Gaëtan Manceaux, competitor for France at the 2014 Mediterranean Athletics U23 Championships – Results
 Jules Manceaux, jeweler who made the sword in the Greek crown jewels
 Louis Manceaux (1865–1934), French medical doctor

See also

 
 Manceau (disambiguation)